Filipek is a Polish language surname from the personal name Philipp. Notable people with the name include:
 Krzysztof Filipek (1961), Polish politician
 Ron Filipek (1944–2005), American basketball player
 Sofía Filipek (1994), Chilean field hockey player
 Zdenko Filípek (1995), Slovak football defender

References 

Polish-language surnames
Surnames from given names